The Holocaust Memorial Center for the Jews of Macedonia (Macedonian: Меморијален центар на холокаустот на Евреите од Македонија, Memorijalen centar na holokaustot na Evreite od Makedonija; Ladino: Sentro Memorial del Holokausto de los Djudios de la Makedonia) is a memorial to the Holocaust of the 7,148 Jews from North Macedonia and the history of the Jews in the Balkans, located in Skopje, the capital city of North Macedonia.

The Holocaust Memorial Center is a multimedia center, consisting of several functional parts.

The construction works began in 2005.

The Memorial Center is located in the so-called Jewish Quarter of Skopje, which was the center of Jewish life in this city until the deportation of the Jews. The museum is located behind the Museum of the Macedonian Struggle, which faces the Vardar River.

The Holocaust Memorial Center for the Jews of Macedonia was officially opened on 10 March 2011, exactly 68 years after the allied Bulgarian and German forces deported the Jews of present-day North Macedonia to the Treblinka extermination camp.

The opening was attended by high-ranking officials from North Macedonia, Israel and other countries, notably the Prime Minister of the Republic of Macedonia Nikola Gruevski, the President of the Republic of Macedonia Gjorge Ivanov, Israeli Vice Prime Minister Moshe Ya'alon, the presidents of Montenegro and Albania, Filip Vujanović and Bamir Topi respectively, as well as a member of the Knesset, religious leaders and diplomats.

Within three days of the memorial opening, it was visited by more than 3,000 people.

See also

References

External links 
 Holocaust Memorial Center for the Jews of Macedonia

Jews and Judaism in North Macedonia
Museums in North Macedonia
Holocaust memorials
Holocaust museums
Memorial Center for the Jews of Macedonia